Magnificent Corpses: Searching Through Europe for St. Peter's Head, St. Claire's Heart, St. Stephen's Hand, and Other Saintly Relics (1999) is a book written by Anneli Rufus, concerning relics enshrined in Europe's churches and cathedrals. Rufus relates the stories behind the saints memorialized and the history of relic veneration. As a non-Catholic, she also describes her experiences of visiting the reliquaries of various saints and the pilgrims that still visit them.

In his review for Salon.com, Frank Browning stated: "Rufus not only tells us the saintly lore, she leads us into the chapels to join the pierced punkers, the helmeted bikers, the terrified children she finds contemplating the holy body parts. Her prose is spare; she allows the scenes to make their own commentary..."

See also
 Pilgrim
 Pilgrimage
 Relic
 Veneration of the dead

External links
Salon.com review

1999 non-fiction books
Christian relics